The 1986 Lorraine Open was a men's tennis tournament played on indoor carpet courts in Metz, France, and was part of the 1986 Nabisco Grand Prix. It was the eighth edition of the tournament and took place from 10 March through 17 March 1986. First-seeded Thierry Tulasne won the singles title.

Finals

Singles
 Thierry Tulasne defeated  Broderick Dyke 6–4, 6–3

Doubles
 Wojciech Fibak /  Guy Forget defeated  Francisco González /  Michiel Schapers 2–6, 6–2, 6–4

References

External links
 ITF tournament edition details

Lorraine Open
Lorraine Open
Lorraine Open, 1986
Lorraine Open